Winnifred Ntumi (born 28 September 2002) is a Ghanaian weightlifter, competing in the 45 kg category and representing Ghana at international competitions. She competed at world championships, most recently at the 2018 Africa Youth Championship, 2019 Africa Weightlifting Championship in Egypt and the 2019 Africa Games in Morocco.

Weightlifting 
In 2019, she won a bronze medal at the 2019 African Weightlifting Championship, competing in the 49 kg category, making her the first Ghanaian to compete and win a medal at the championship. Prior to that, she represented Ghana at the 2018 Africa Youth Championship and won a bronze medal for competing in the women's 48 kg category in Egypt.

She also competed in the 2019 Africa Games in Morocco and won three bronze medals for competing in the women's 45 kg category, making her the first Ghanaian to win a medal at the continental Weightlifting competition.

She competed in the women's 49 kg event at the 2021 World Weightlifting Championships held in Tashkent, Uzbekistan. The 2021 Commonwealth Weightlifting Championships were also held at the same time and her total result gave her the bronze medal in this event.

She finished in 9th place in the women's 49 kg event at the 2022 Commonwealth Games held in Birmingham, England.

References

External links

Living people
2002 births
Ghanaian female weightlifters
African sportspeople
African Games bronze medalists for Ghana
Competitors at the 2019 African Games
African Games medalists in weightlifting
Weightlifters at the 2022 Commonwealth Games
Commonwealth Games competitors for Ghana
21st-century Ghanaian women